Trevor Sinclair is a Sydney-based radio host. He began his Sydney radio career in 1978 at the then most popular commercial music station in the city 2SM. Prior to this he had worked on provincial radio in New South Wales and the Australian Capital Territory.

Early life
Sinclair's career began in the small town of Young on 25 October 1976. He moved to the Regional District of Nowra in 1977, before commencing the Early Night Show, from 7pm-10pm, at Canberra's 2CC in March 1978. Sinclair also hosted a very successful late afternoon TV show, "Connections" on local television station CTC-7 from April until October 1978. He was offered a position at Sydney's 2SM in late 1978 and soon after took over the Afternoon Show.

In late 1979 Sinclair joined former 2SM colleagues, Ron E Sparks (Program Director), Trevor Johnson (Assistant Program Director) and Gordon O'Byrne (Presenter) for the rebirth of Sydney station 2UW that was then owned by the Albert family who owned radio stations in Sydney, Melbourne and Brisbane which became known as the Australian Radio Network (ARN). Sinclair continued his association with the Network through its AM stations in Sydney (2UW) and Melbourne (3KZ) conversion to the FM band (Sydney's Mix 106.5 and Melbourne's TT FM) until 2001.

Sinclair was host of several nationally syndicated radio shows during the 1980s and 1990s for Grace Gibson Radio Productions and ARNSAT including The Hitfile, Music Over Australia and How it was-When it was.

Following a take-over and sale of ARN to Australian Provincial Newspapers and America's Clear Channel Communications, Sinclair found himself back in the Regional Radio Market working for DMG Radio Australia, who had recently launched its Nova network across the country. Nova sold off its Regional assets to enable it to buy two new Radio licences in Sydney and Melbourne, Sinclair was again back in Sydney at the newly launched Vega 95.3. He hosted the Network Night Show for a time on Sydney's Vega 95.3 and Melbourne's Vega 91.5, followed by autonomous shows in both Sydney and Melbourne from time to time from 2005 until 2009.

Now
Until April 2012 he was hosting the Drive Show on 2CH in Sydney before moving into a Breakfast Show support role.

In 2013 Sinclair was appointed Executive Producer/Anchor of the Better Homes & Gardens Radio Show, heard on 70 stations across Australia.

For 12 years Sinclair was also the host of "FMQ - on Radio Q" on Qantas.

In March 2017, following the sale of 2CH by Macquarie Radio Network to a consortium of Oceania Capital Partners, Glenn Wheatley and John Williams, and the launch of its Easy Classics format, Trevor once again found himself at 2CH where he hosted the Breakfast Show with Indira Naidoo from April 2018 until December 2019.
In January 2020 Trevor moved to host the Afternoon-Drive Show.

Trevor left 2CH in 2021 and relocated to Victoria and joined 3MP as their evenings presenter.

References

External links
Trevor Sinclair profile at 2CH

Australian radio presenters
Living people
People from Sydney
Year of birth missing (living people)